Aladdin is a 1958 musical fantasy written especially for television, with a book by S.J. Perelman and music and lyrics by Cole Porter, telecast in color on the DuPont Show of the Month by CBS.  It was Porter's last musical score. Columbia Records issued both monophonic and stereophonic recordings of the original TV cast: Cyril Ritchard, Dennis King, Basil Rathbone, Anna Maria Alberghetti, Geoffrey Holder (as the Genie), Sal Mineo (as Aladdin), and Una Merkel (as Aladdin's mother).

The musical was adapted for the stage premiering December 17, 1959, at the London Coliseum, starring Bob Monkhouse, Doretta Morrow, Ian Wallace, and Ronald Shiner, under the musical direction of Bobby Howell.  The London stage production expanded the score with several songs Cole Porter had originally penned for other productions.

Musical numbers
Sony Records digitally remastered the original stereo recording for CD release; musical numbers included:
"Come to the Supermarket (in Old Peking)"	
"Make Way (for the Emperor)"
"Trust Your Destiny To Your Star"
"Opportunity Knocks but Once (at Thuh Door)"	
"Aladdin"
"Wouldn't It Be Fun"
"I Adore You"
"No Wonder Taxes Are High"
"I Adore You (Reprise)"

The London stage production also included:
"There Must Be Someone For Me" (from Mexican Hayride)
"Cherry Pies Ought to Be You"  (from Out of This World)
"I Am Loved"  (from Out of This World)
"Ridin' High"  (from Red, Hot and Blue!)

Footage
The original telecast was never repeated (despite videotape being in use at the time), nor was it released on VHS or DVD. A kinescope of the 1958 broadcast survives at both the New York City and Beverly Hills branches of the Paley Center for Media.

Influence
Barbra Streisand recorded the list song "Come to the Supermarket (in Old Peking)" for The Barbra Streisand Album in 1963.  The same song was recorded by John Inman for Are You Being Served Sir? in  1975.  Patti LuPone recorded the same song for her 1993 Live album.

Moral of The Story 

Aladdin is a story which was written as a family friendly show. But it is not only used for entertainment. It is also a good source of teaching lesson for the younger people. It teaches self trust, having faith on self, use of present intelligence etc. In the story we see that Jafar as know as the villain uses Aladdin for his won  benefit. When there was a time when Aladdin needed help to get out of the cave, Aladdin asked for help to Jafar , Jafar did not help him he asked for the lamp first. Aladdin did not gave him the lamp. Which teaches that self trust is important and self care is important. on the other hand at the end of the story Aladdin asked the king for the permission to marry Jasmin but the king was brutal to Aladdin. But when the king got Imprisoned and needed help Aladdin helped the king. This teaches to have forgiveness heart.

Lost Musicals revival
In 2012, as part of his Lost Musicals project, Ian Marshall-Fisher directed a stage revival at Sadler's Wells, London. The cast included John Savident as The Magician, Richard Dempsey as Aladdin, Vivienne Martin as Aladdin's mother, Candy Ma as the Princess and Rhiannon Drake as Jade Bud. The production garnered much media attention, due to the well-known cast.

References

External links

1958 television films
1958 films
1950s American variety television series
Films based on Aladdin
CBS network films
1950s English-language films